Napgate may refer to:
 Ken Griffey Jr.'s sleeping in the Seattle Mariners' clubhouse in 2010.
 Ilya Bryzgalov allegedly sleeping in a Philadelphia Flyers' team meeting in 2013.